Dudaktan Kalbe ("From the Lips to the Heart") is a Turkish television series. It stars Burak Hakkı and Aslı Tandoğan. It is the fifth adaptation of Reşat Nuri Güntekin's famous novel, Dudaktan Kalbe. He was one of the most popular writers of his period and was also a prominent name in the history of Turkish literature and drama. Dudaktan Kalbe recalls the pathos and romance of Leo Tolstoy's novels. It was published in 1923 and focuses on the struggle between ethics, loyalty, love and ambition. The television series ran for two seasons. This series is currently airing in Serbia as Plač violine on Prva TV at 19:20 from June 24, 2013.

Story
The story concerns four main characters - Kenan, Lamia, Cemil and Cavidan - and the complicated relationships that develop as they experience the triumphs and tragedies of life. The supporting characters provide a colorful and realistic background and the settings showcase the beauty of the Turkish islands.

Hüseyin Kenan is a sensitive and talented musician who has struggled to overcome the emotional pain of a difficult and poverty-stricken childhood, and the grudging charity of his relatives. His childhood was deeply marked by the suicide of his father while in prison for robbery, and the unkindness of his uncle, Saib Bey, who raised him. Kenan feels unworthy of his first love, Leyla, and sacrifices their relationship to travel overseas and focus on his career, becoming a famous violinist but suppressing his true feelings to attain his ambition. Kenan's cousin, Cemil, marries Leyla even though he knows she doesn't love him. He hopes that one day she will forget Kenan and turn to him, but his wife's continued coldness causes him deep anguish and despair.

The main female character is Lamia, a young girl who is a devoted fan of Kenan and his music. After her parents' death she lives with relatives who provide food and shelter but treat her as a servant. Although doing her best to please them, they attempt to marry her to one of their relatives against her will. When Kenan and Lamia meet, there is an immediate physical and emotional attraction but Kenan suppresses his love because of Lamia's inferior social position and the damage such a relationship might cause to his reputation. He does his best to help and protect Lamia without admitting his deep feelings and without making a real commitment to her. Kenan finally marries Cavidan, a powerful businesswoman and the daughter of a wealthy family, but sees Lamia's face instead of Cavidan's as she walks towards him in her wedding dress.

Cemil is a conflicted character whose jealousy of his famous cousin causes him to behave badly to his wife and to try to undermine Kenan's career. When Cemil faces disastrous consequences after coming to Lamia's rescue, she takes the blame for his actions and her life becomes very difficult. After his wife's death, Cemil begins to fall deeply in love with Lamia and his unselfish love changes him completely. It is a long and difficult task for Cemil to overcome Lamia's initial dislike and mistrust.

Kenan and Lamia share a strong bond through their little daughter, Melek, and the complex and ever-changing relationships between Kenan, Lamia and Cemil provide drama and pathos. Kenan's inability to fully commit to the woman he loves brings a heavy penalty. Lamia's recognition of the difference between childish infatuation and true love, and Cemil's unselfish and patient devotion, bring the series to a surprising conclusion. At the end Kenan commits suicide whereas Lamia and Cemil get married.

References

External links
 Official website of the TV series
 

Turkish drama television series
2007 Turkish television series debuts
2009 Turkish television series endings
Television series by Ay Yapım
2000s Turkish television series
Show TV original programming